Brett Hood (born 11 September 1973) is a New Zealand cricketer. He played in two first-class matches for Northern Districts in 2000/01.

See also
 List of Northern Districts representative cricketers

References

External links
 

1973 births
Living people
New Zealand cricketers
Northern Districts cricketers
People from Warkworth, New Zealand